Darren R. Huston (born 3 January 1966) is a Canadian businessman and the former president and chief executive officer (CEO) of Priceline and Booking.com.

Early life
Darren R. Huston was born on 3 January 1966 in Hope, British Columbia, Canada. He completed his high school education at the United World College of the Adriatic in Italy, received a BS in economics from Trent University, an MA in economics from the University of British Columbia, and an MBA from the Harvard Business School.

Career
From 1990 to 1992 Huston was an economic advisor in the Canadian government. From 1994 to 1998 he held an executive position with McKinsey & Company. From 1998 to 2003 he was a senior vice president at Starbucks. In 2005 he became president and CEO of Microsoft Japan, and from 2008 served as Microsoft's corporate vice president, leading the company's consumer and online business. He joined Booking.com as CEO in September 2011, and became CEO of parent company Priceline on 1 January 2014.

On 28 April 2016 he resigned as CEO of Priceline following an investigation relating to a personal relationship he had with an employee who was not under his direct supervision. He received no severance package and forfeited almost $15.3 million in unvested stock equity. Jeffery Boyd, Priceline's chairman and CEO from 2002 to 2013, took over as interim CEO.

References

Living people
1966 births
People educated at a United World College
University of British Columbia alumni
Harvard Business School alumni
Trent University alumni
Canadian chief executives
Businesspeople from British Columbia
Booking Holdings people